The Battle of Luzon was a land battle of the Pacific Theater of Operations of World War II by the Allied forces of the U.S., its colony the Philippines, and allies against forces of the Empire of Japan. The battle resulted in a U.S. and Filipino victory. The Allies had taken control of all strategically and economically important locations of Luzon by March 1945, although pockets of Japanese resistance held out in the mountains until the unconditional surrender of Japan. While not the highest in U.S. casualties, it is the highest net casualty battle U.S. forces fought in World War II, with 192,000 to 217,000 Japanese combatants dead (mostly from starvation and disease), 8,000 American combatants killed, and over 150,000 Filipinos, overwhelmingly civilians who were murdered by Japanese forces, mainly during the Manila massacre of February 1945.

Background
The Philippines was considered to be of great strategic importance because their capture by Japan would pose a significant threat to the U.S. As a result, 135,000 troops and 227 aircraft were stationed in the Philippines by October 1941. However, Luzon—the largest island in the Philippines—was captured by Imperial Japanese forces in 1942. General Douglas MacArthur—who was in charge of the defense of the Philippines at the time—was ordered to Australia, and the remaining U.S. forces retreated to the Bataan Peninsula.

A few months after this, MacArthur expressed his belief that an attempt to recapture the Philippines was necessary. The U.S. Pacific Commander Admiral Chester Nimitz and Chief of Naval Operations Admiral Ernest King both opposed this idea, arguing that it must wait until victory was certain. MacArthur had to wait two years for his wish; it was 1944 before a campaign to recapture the Philippines was launched. The island of Leyte was the first objective of the campaign, which was captured by the end of December 1944. This was followed by the attack on Mindoro, and later, Luzon.

Prelude
Before U.S. forces could launch the attack on Luzon, a base of operation needed to be established close to the island. Airbases in particular had to be established in order to provide the advancing troops with air support. Troops under Brigadier General William C. Dunckel captured the island of Mindoro, with the assistance of the 7th Fleet. By 28 December, two airbases were controlled by the U.S. and were ready to assist in the attack on Luzon, which was scheduled to be launched on 9 January 1945. With the capture of Mindoro, U.S. forces were positioned south of Luzon. However, MacArthur intended to land his forces at Lingayen, further north. This would place his troops close to several roads and railways on Luzon, which led to Manila—the main objective—through the plains in the center of the island.

Deception operations
U.S. aircraft constantly made reconnaissance and bombing flights over southern Luzon, intending to deceive the Japanese forces into believing that the attack on Luzon would come from the south. In addition, transport aircraft were used to make parachute drops with dummies. Minesweepers were used to clear the bays of Balayan, Batangas, and Tayabas, located to the south of Luzon, and Filipino resistance fighters conducted sabotage operations in southern Luzon. These deception operations failed to convince General Yamashita, the leader of the Imperial Japanese Army in the Philippines, and he built significant defensive positions in the hills and mountains surrounding Lingayen Gulf in Northern Luzon.

Opposing forces

Allied

Allied Forces, Southwest Pacific Area

General Douglas MacArthur

 US Sixth Army (193,901 officers and enlisted)
Lieutenant General Walter Krueger

Western Landing Area (Lingayen):
 XIV Army Corps (Maj. Gen. Oscar W. Griswold)
 37th Infantry ("Buckeye") Division (Maj. Gen. Robert S. Beightler)
 40th Infantry ("Sunshine") Division (Maj. Gen. I. Rapp Brush)

Eastern Landing Area (San Fabian):
 I Army Corps (Maj. Gen. Innis P. Swift)
 43rd Infantry ("Winged Victory") Division (Maj. Gen. Leonard F. Wing)
 6th Infantry ("Red Star") Division (Maj. Gen. Edwin D. Patrick)

Japanese

Fourteenth Area Army
General Tomoyuki Yamashita

Northern Luzon:
 Shobu Group (Gen. Yamashita)
 approx. 152,000 officers and enlisted

Central Luzon:
 Kembu Group (Lieut. Gen. Rikichi Tsukada)
 approx. 30,000 officers and enlisted

Southern Luzon:
 Shimbu Group (Lieut. Gen. Shizuo Yokoyama)
 approx. 80,000 officers and enlisted

Battle

The assault on Luzon was launched, as planned, on 9 January 1945, codenamed S-day. The Japanese forces reported more than 70 Allied warships entering Lingayen Gulf, though the total Allied invasion force involved that month would equal close to 800 ships. Pre-assault bombardment of Japanese shore positions from roughly 70 battleships and cruisers began at 7:00. The landings were commenced an hour later. The landing forces faced strong opposition from Japanese kamikaze aircraft. The escort carrier  was destroyed by a kamikaze attack, with a total of around 47 ships damaged, and four sunk, on January 3–13, primarily by kamikazes.
 Aircraft from the 3rd Fleet assisted the landings with close air support, strafing and bombing Japanese gun positions.

The landings at Lingayen Gulf on 9 January were carried out by the 6th Army under the command of General Walter Krueger. Approximately 175,000 troops from the 6th Army landed along the  beachhead within a few days, while the I Corps protected their flanks. XIV Corps under General Oscar Griswold then advanced south toward Manila, despite Krueger's concerns that his eastern flank was unprotected and vulnerable if the Japanese forces attacked. However, no such attack occurred, and the U.S. forces did not meet much resistance until they reached the Clark Air Base on 23 January. The battle there lasted until the end of January, and after capturing the base, XIV Corps advanced toward Manila.

On 31 January, two regiments of the 11th Airborne Division made an airborne assault, capturing a bridge, and later advanced toward Manila. On 3 February, the 1st Cavalry Division captured the bridge across Tullahan River leading to the city. They advanced into the city that evening, and the battle for the capture of Manila began. On 4 February, the paratroopers of the 11th Airborne—approaching the city from the south—came to the main Japanese defences south of the city of Manila where their advance was halted by heavy resistance. General Yamashita had ordered his troops to destroy all bridges and other vital installations as soon as the U.S. forces entered the city, and Japanese forces entrenched throughout the city continued to resist U.S. forces. General MacArthur announced the imminent recapture of Manila on the same day. On 11 February, the 11th Airborne Division captured the last Japanese outer defences, thus encircling the whole city. U.S. and Filipino forces carried out clearing operations in the city in the following weeks. Military casualties totalled 1,010 Americans, 3,079 Filipinos and 12,000 Japanese.

Aftermath
Battles continued throughout the island of Luzon in the following weeks, with more U.S. troops having landed on the island. Filipino and American resistance fighters also attacked Japanese positions and secured several locations. The Allies had taken control of all strategically and economically important locations of Luzon by early March. Small groups of the remaining Japanese forces retreated to the mountainous areas in the north and southeast of the island, where they were besieged for months. Pockets of Japanese soldiers held out in the mountains—most ceasing resistance with the unconditional surrender of Japan, but a scattered few holding out for many years afterwards. Casualties were stunningly high for the Japanese. Japanese losses were 217,000 dead, with 9,050 taken prisoners. U.S. losses were far lower, with 8,310 killed and 29,560 wounded. Civilian casualties are estimated at 120,000 to 140,000 dead.

See also
Invasion of Lingayen Gulf
Battle of Bessang Pass
Battle of Balete Pass
Battle of Manila (1945)
Battle of Villa Verde Trail
List of American guerrillas in the Philippines
Escuadrón 201
Japanese holdout
Manila massacre
William R. Shockley

Notes

References

Further reading

External links

Luzon
Luzon
Luzon
Luzon
1945 in the Philippines
Luzon